John Cheyne Valentine (13 March 1930 – 17 February 2019) was a Scottish footballer, who played for Queen's Park, Rangers and St Johnstone in the Scottish League.

He is known for his ill-fated appearance at the 1957 Scottish League Cup Final, where he played centre-half for the Rangers team which lost 7–1 to Celtic. Valentine made only 10 appearances for Rangers, all in the 1957–58 season.

Valentine died in February 2019, aged 88.

References

1930 births
2019 deaths
Scottish footballers
Queen's Park F.C. players
Rangers F.C. players
St Johnstone F.C. players
Scottish Football League players
Association football central defenders
Buckie Thistle F.C. players
Scotland amateur international footballers